Savski Venac is a municipality of the city of Belgrade. According to the 2011 census results, the municipality has a population of 39,122 inhabitants.

It is one of the three municipalities which constitute the very center of Belgrade, together with Stari Grad and Vračar.

Savski Venac is located on the right bank of the Sava river. It borders the municipalities of Stari Grad to the north, Vračar to the north-east, Voždovac to the east, Rakovica to the south and Čukarica to the west.

History and name

While Savski Venac and Stari Grad are often styled the oldest municipalities of Belgrade due to their inclusion of the oldest sections of urban Belgrade outside the walls of the Kalemegdan fortress, they are actually the most recently created municipalities of Belgrade. Both were formed in 1957 by merger of older, smaller municipalities; Savski Venac was formed in by merger of the municipalities of Zapadni Vračar (its main predecessor) and Topčidersko Brdo and a new, geographical name, Savski Venac, was coined for it.

(Venac is usually used in Belgrade's geography in term of a round street (Obilićev Venac, Kosančićev Venac) or a rim of the river (Dunavski Venac). In this case it was the "rim of the Sava".)

Geography
Despite being small in area, it includes several diverse geographical features:

the low section on the right bank of the Sava river (Savamala and Bara Venecija). Due to its low altitude toward the Sava, and lack of any protection, this is the only part of central urban area of Belgrade that gets flooded during the extremely high waters of the river. It was almost completely flooded in 1984 and during major floods in 2006.
southern slopes of the hill of Terazije (Terazijska Terasa) which descends from downtown Belgrade to the Sava.
entire western slope of the Vračar Hill (Karađorđev Park and former Zapadni Vračar) which also descends to the Sava.
southern slope of the  Vračar Hill, known as the Guberevac Hill or Ludo Brdo ("Crazy Hill") as it is the location of the psychiatric hospital "Laza Lazarević".
the former valley of the stream od Mokroluški Potok, now conducted underground. It is a route to the modern highway and the new railstation of Prokop.
the hill of Topčidersko Brdo which has a cliff-like edge above the Sava (Senjak).
the hill of Banjica in the extreme south of the municipality.
the upper valley of Topčiderska reka and the vast park-forest of Topčider.

Neighborhoods

Demographics

According to the census of 2011, Savski Venac has a population of 39,122 inhabitants. As all the other central city municipalities, it has been depopulating for decades, however, it still remains one of the most densely populated:  (4,686/km² or 12,136/sq mi back in 1961).

Ethnic structure
The ethnic composition of the municipality:

Administration
Presidents of the municipality (since 1997):
 1997–2000: Zdravko Krstić
 2000–2004: Branislav Belić
 2004–2012: Tomislav Đorđević 
 2012–2016: Dušan Dinčić
 2016–2020: Irena Vujović
 2020–present: Miloš Vidović

Economy
The following table gives a preview of total number of registered people employed in legal entities per their core activity (as of 2018):

Sport
Sportsko Selo ("Sport Village") – In the early 1970s a football pitch was built at the end of the Deligradska street, right above the highway. It was adapted into the Yugoslav People's Army Reserve Officers' Training Ground, but in the early 1990s the location was abandoned. The lot was left unattended and gradually turned into a rubbish dump. In 2009 a project for the ground was jointly drafted by the city and the municipality with the working title "Ada Ciganlija u malom". After two years of construction, the new complex was opened on 30 May 2011. There are also a futsal and bocce courts, outdoor gym, walking paths, rest areas, wooden ice-cream kiosk and a parking lot. The complex is situated in a wooded area and includes an amphitheater suitable for the theatrical performances in the open. Invited to choose the name for the complex between the originally proposed "Ada Ciganlija u malom" and "Sportsko Selo" which appeared during the construction, citizens picked the latter.

Features
Savski Venac constitutes the western section of the downtown Belgrade. Most government offices and administrative buildings are located in the municipality, including:

Administration
 The Government of the Republic of Serbia in Nemanjina Street
 The building of the ministries, also in Nemanjina street
 The new building of the National Bank of Serbia, (Slavija)
 The former buildings of republic and federal police (destroyed during the 1999 NATO's attack)
 The former complex of the Joint Chiefs of Staff (same as the above)
 Over 30 embassies and dozens of ambassadorial residences
 Archives of Yugoslavia (Senjak)

Traffic

 Belgrade Main railway station (Savski trg)
 Main bus station of Belgrade (BAS)
 Main bus station of Lasta (Bara Venecija)
 Belgrade Centre railway station (Prokop)
 The Belgrade-Niš highway and all the six bridges across the Sava to Novi Beograd: Brankov, Stari savski, Gazela, Stari želenički, Novi železnički, Most na Adi
 Both major interchanges in old Belgrade: Mostarska Petlja and Autokomanda

Economy and tourism
 BIP Brewery
 Belgrade Fair (Beogradski sajam, on the bank of the Sava)
 Open green market "Zeleni Venac"
 Hotel "Astorija"
 Hotel "Beograd"
 Hotel Bristol
 Beli Dvor, former royal court

Health
 Clinical Centre of Serbia, with 24 clinics and hospitals (beginning at Karađorđev park); two skyscrapers, which were to become one single Clinical Centre (Policlinic), a joint location for all the existing separate clinics, were planned already in 1973. Construction began in 1976, but due to the lack of funding, the works were soon halted. They were resumed in 1983 and in 1987 the first building was finished, but only the lower floors became operational. Upper floors remained unfinished and left to the elements since. Preliminary works, which include reconstruction of the finished structure and the construction of another one began on 6 December 2018. In March 2019, the Health ministry announced that the renovation of the operational part, revitalization of the empty building and construction of the twin tower, will all be finished by 2022.
 University's Children hospital in Tiršova Street, built from 1936 to 1940. Construction of the new children's hospital, colloquially called Tiršova 2, closer to the highway, began on 20 October 2021.

 City ambulance (Mostar)
 Hospital Dragiša Mišović (Dedinje)
 Železnička hospital (Dedinje)
 Orthopaedic hospital (Banjica)
 Vojnomedicinska akademija ("VMA", Banjica)

Culture and education
 Yugoslav Drama Theatre
 Theater Bojan Stupica
 Student's Cultural Center (SKC)
 University of Belgrade Faculty of Economics
 Faculty of the veterinarian medicine of the Belgrade University
 Touristic high school (Jug Bogdanova street)
 French School (Ecole Française de Belgrade)

Forests and parks
Urban forests and parks include:

 Bencion Buli Forest
 Banjica Rise Forest
 Park Bristol
 Čukarica Bay Forest
 Park Gavrilo Princip
 Grafičar Forest
 Hajd Park
 Lisičji Potok Forest
 Park Luka Ćelović
 Park Manjež
 Park Milutin Milanković
 Reiss Slope Forest
 Topčider Forest, with the entire complex around the Konak of Prince Miloš
 Topčidersko Brdo Forest

See also
 Subdivisions of Belgrade
 List of Belgrade neighborhoods and suburbs

References

External links

 

 
Municipalities of Belgrade